Pedro Michel Hernández (born April 12, 1989) is a Venezuelan former professional baseball pitcher. He played in Major League Baseball (MLB) with the Chicago White Sox, Minnesota Twins, and Colorado Rockies.

Professional career

San Diego Padres
Hernández signed with the San Diego Padres as an international free agent in 2009, after he graduated from the Padres baseball academy in the Dominican Republic. After the 2011 season, the Padres added Hernández to their 40 man roster to protect him from the Rule 5 draft. Later in the 2011-12 offseason, the Padres traded Hernández and Simón Castro to the White Sox for Carlos Quentin.

Chicago White Sox
On July 18, 2012, Hernández made his major league debut against the Boston Red Sox.  Hernández started the game against Felix Doubront.  He was tagged for a three-run home run by Cody Ross in the bottom of the third inning and the bottom of the 4th inning, and was relieved by Hector Santiago in the bottom of the 5th inning, picking up the loss.

Minnesota Twins
On July 28, 2012, Hernández was traded to the Minnesota Twins with Eduardo Escobar for Francisco Liriano. He was outrighted off the roster on October 25, 2013.

Colorado Rockies
Hernández signed a minor league deal with the Colorado Rockies on November 15, 2013. He was designated for assignment on August 2, 2014.

St. Paul Saints
Hernandez signed with the St. Paul Saints of the American Association of Independent Professional Baseball for the 2015 season. He became a free agent at the end of the season.

Rieleros de Aguascalientes
On February 26, 2016, Hernández signed with the Rieleros de Aguascalientes of the Mexican Baseball League.

Tigres de Quintana Roo
On May 26, 2016, Hernández was traded to the Tigres de Quintana Roo of the Mexican Baseball League. He was released on June 30, 2016.

Texas AirHogs
On February 9, 2018, Hernández signed with the Sussex County Miners of the Can-Am League. On April 15, 2018, he was traded to the Texas AirHogs of the American Association. He was released on November 12, 2018.

See also
 List of Major League Baseball players from Venezuela

References

External links
, or Pelota Binaria (Venezuelan Winter League)

1989 births
Living people
Arizona League Padres players
Birmingham Barons players
Charlotte Knights players
Chicago White Sox players
Colorado Rockies players
Colorado Springs Sky Sox players
Dominican Summer League Padres players
Venezuelan expatriate baseball players in the Dominican Republic
Eugene Emeralds players
Fort Wayne TinCaps players
Gulf Coast Twins players
Lake Elsinore Storm players
Major League Baseball pitchers
Major League Baseball players from Venezuela
Mexican League baseball pitchers
Minnesota Twins players
Navegantes del Magallanes players
New Britain Rock Cats players
Sportspeople from Barquisimeto
Rieleros de Aguascalientes players
Rochester Red Wings players
San Antonio Missions players
St. Paul Saints players
Texas AirHogs players
Tigres de Quintana Roo players
Tucson Padres players
Venezuelan expatriate baseball players in Mexico
Venezuelan expatriate baseball players in the United States